Karuvanthuruthy is a census town in Kozhikode district in the Indian state of Kerala.

Demographics
 Indian census, Karuvanthuruthy had a population of 20,767. Males constitute 49% of the population and females 51%. Karuvanthuruthy has an average literacy rate of 81%, higher than the national average of 59.5%: male literacy is 84%, and female literacy is 79%. In Karuvanthuruthy, 12% of the population is under 6 years of age.

See also
 Beypore
 Feroke
 Kadalundi
 Kadalundi Bird Sanctuary
 Vallikkunnu
 Chaliyar river

References

Villages in Kozhikode district
Kozhikode south